Statistics of Swiss Super League in the 1980–81 season.

Overview
It was contested by 14 teams, and FC Zürich won the championship.

League standings

Results

Sources
 Switzerland 1980–81 at RSSSF

Swiss Football League seasons
Swiss
1980–81 in Swiss football